Harland James Svare (November 25, 1930 – April 4, 2020) was an American professional football player, coach and general manager.  Svare was a linebacker who played eight seasons with the Los Angeles Rams and New York Giants of the National Football League (NFL) from 1953 to 1960.  He was the Rams head coach from midway the 1962 season through 1965, and the San Diego Chargers head coach from 1971 through 1973. He was general manager of the Chargers from 1971 to 1976.

During the halftime intermission of a November 1972 game, Chargers owner Eugene V. Klein awarded Svare a five-year coaching contract, an unpopular decision; however, Svare voluntarily stepped down from the position during the following season.

Head coaching record

References

1930 births
2020 deaths
American football linebackers
Los Angeles Rams coaches
Los Angeles Rams players
National Football League general managers
New York Giants players
San Diego Chargers coaches
San Diego Chargers executives
Washington State Cougars football players
People from Yellow Medicine County, Minnesota
San Diego Chargers head coaches
Los Angeles Rams head coaches